-ade is a suffix used for a fruit– (often citrus) flavored beverage. These drinks may be carbonated or non-carbonated. Widespread examples include lemonade, cherryade, limeade, and orangeade. It is often mixed with water. 

The suffix has also been used in brand names, including Kool-Aid and Flavor Aid. It is also a popular naming convention with sports drinks, starting with Lucozade, first manufactured in 1927 under the name Glucozade, and it was renamed Lucozade in 1929. Other examples include Powerade, Accelerade, Staminade, Sporade, and Gatorade.

The suffix is more formally used to denote an action, or a product of an action, for example with the word "blockade" meaning a physical barrier that was created with the intention of blocking.

Etymology
The suffix -ade originates from the Latin -ata, which is a past participle used for forming nouns. It was introduced to English in the word lemonade, a loanword from French. It also derives from Italian name limonata and Wigan "ayde".

See also

Soft drink
Squash (drink)
List of soft drink flavors

References

Fruit juice
Non-alcoholic drinks
ade
English suffixes